Ravne is a small settlement in the hills northeast of Cerknica in the Inner Carniola region of Slovenia. It is around 20 km south of Ljubljana.

References

External links

Ravne on Geopedia

Populated places in the Municipality of Cerknica